In algebraic geometry, an algebraic variety or scheme X  is normal if it is normal at every point, meaning that the local ring at the point is an integrally closed domain. An affine variety X (understood to be irreducible) is normal if and only if the ring O(X) of regular functions on X is an integrally closed domain. A variety X over a field is normal if and only if every finite birational morphism from any variety Y to X is an isomorphism.

Geometric and algebraic interpretations of normality
A morphism of varieties is finite if the inverse image of every point is finite and the morphism is proper. A morphism of varieties
is birational if it restricts to an isomorphism between dense open subsets. So, for example, the cuspidal cubic curve X in the affine plane A2 defined by x2 = y3 is not normal, because there is a finite birational morphism A1 → X
(namely, t maps to (t3, t2)) which is not an isomorphism. By contrast, the affine line A1 is normal: it cannot be simplified any further by finite birational morphisms.

A normal complex variety X has the property, when viewed as a stratified space using the classical topology, that every link is connected. Equivalently, every complex point x has arbitrarily small neighborhoods U such that U minus
the singular set of X is connected. For example, it follows that the nodal cubic curve X in the figure, defined by  x2 = y2(y + 1), is not normal. This also follows from the definition of normality, since there is a finite birational morphism from A1 to X which is not an isomorphism; it sends two points of A1 to the same point in X.

More generally, a scheme X is normal if each of its local rings

OX,x

is an integrally closed domain. That is, each of these rings is an integral domain R, and every ring S with R ⊆ S ⊆ Frac(R) such that S is finitely generated as an R-module is equal to R. (Here Frac(R) denotes the field of fractions of R.) This is a direct translation, in terms of local rings, of the geometric condition that every finite birational morphism to X is an isomorphism.

An older notion is that a subvariety X of projective space is linearly normal if the linear system giving the embedding is complete. Equivalently, X ⊆ Pn is not the linear projection of an embedding X ⊆  Pn+1 (unless X is contained
in a hyperplane Pn). This is the meaning of "normal" in the phrases rational normal curve and rational normal scroll.

Every regular scheme is normal. Conversely,  showed that  every normal variety is regular outside a subset of codimension at least 2, and a similar result is true for schemes. So, for example, every normal curve is regular.

The normalization
Any reduced scheme X has a unique normalization: a normal scheme Y with an integral birational morphism Y → X. (For X a variety over a field, the morphism Y → X is finite, which is stronger than "integral".) The normalization of a scheme of dimension 1 is regular, and the normalization of a scheme of dimension 2 has only isolated singularities.  Normalization is not usually used for resolution of singularities for schemes of higher dimension.

To define the normalization, first suppose that X is an irreducible  reduced scheme X. Every affine open subset of X has the form Spec R with R an integral domain. Write X as a union of affine open subsets Spec Ai.  Let Bi be the integral closure of Ai in its fraction field. Then the normalization of X is defined by gluing together the affine schemes
Spec Bi.

If the initial scheme is not irreducible, the normalization is defined to be the disjoint union of the normalizations of the irreducible components.

Examples

Normalization of a cusp 
Consider the affine curvewith the cusp singularity at the origin. Its normalization can be given by the mapinduced from the algebra map

Normalization of axes in affine plane 
For example,is not an irreducible scheme since it has two components. Its normalization is given by the scheme morphisminduced from the two quotient maps

Normalization of reducible projective variety 
Similarly, for homogeneous irreducible polynomials  in a UFD, the normalization ofis given by the morphism

See also 

 Noether normalization lemma
 Resolution of singularities

Notes

References
 
, p. 91

Scheme theory
Algebraic geometry